Baladiyah Al Malaz (also Al-Malaz), in English as the Al-Malaz Sub-Municipality, is an urban baladiyah and one of 14 sub-municipalities of Riyadh, Saudi Arabia. Besides the eponymous neighborhood after which it is named, it consists of 14 other localities and sub-districts, including az-Zahra, al-Faruq, ad-Dhubat, Jarir and ar-Rabwah. and is responsible for their planning, development and maintenance.

Sub-districts and neighbourhoods
Baladiyah al-Malaz consists of 15 neighbourhood and sub-districts:

 al-Malazz 
 az-Zahra
 ad-Dhubat
 al-Faruq
 al-Thulaim
 al-Futah
 Jarir
 Al Wizarat
 ar-Rabwah
 al-Safa
 al-Murabba
 al-Olaya (partially)
 Sinaiyah Qadeem (partially)

References

External links

 Riyadh, Al-Malaz on YouTube

Malaz